Olexiy Lukashevych (born 11 January 1977, in Dnipropetrovsk) is a Ukrainian long jumper, best known for winning the 2002 European Championships. His personal best is 8.27 metres, achieved in June 2000 in Tartu.

Achievements

References

External links

1977 births
Living people
Ukrainian male long jumpers
Athletes (track and field) at the 2000 Summer Olympics
Olympic athletes of Ukraine
European Athletics Championships medalists
Universiade medalists in athletics (track and field)
Universiade gold medalists for Ukraine
Competitors at the 2001 Goodwill Games
Sportspeople from Dnipro